The Prümscheid is a mountain, in the Eifel mountains in Germany. It is located near Wallenborn in the county of Vulkaneifel and is one of the highest peaks in the Eifel. Nearby villages are Salm, Büscheich and Wallenborn.

References 

Mountains under 1000 metres
Mountains and hills of the Eifel
Vulkaneifel
Natural monuments in Germany